This is a list of years in Latvia.

16th century

17th century

18th century

19th century

20th century

21st century

See also
Timeline of Latvian history

 
Latvia history-related lists
Latvia